Ngaio Marsh House is an historic home in Valley Road in the Christchurch suburb of Cashmere. It was the home of writer Ngaio Marsh for most of her life, and now serves as a museum to her. It is registered as a Category I heritage place by Heritage New Zealand for its outstanding historical significance in relation to Marsh.

History 
The house was built for Ngaio Marsh's parents. It was designed by their relation architect Samuel Hurst Seager. The house has been extended a number of times: firstly in 1948 by architectural firm Helmore and Cotterill; and later, in 1980, a studio, designed by Don Donnithorne, was added on the ground floor.

Heritage registration 
The building was registered as a Category I heritage building by the New Zealand Historic Places Trust (now Heritage New Zealand) on 27 June 1985, with registration number 3673.

Gallery

See also 

 List of historic places in Christchurch

References 

Heritage New Zealand Category 1 historic places in Canterbury, New Zealand
Houses completed in 1907
Buildings and structures in Christchurch
1900s architecture in New Zealand
Art collections in New Zealand